Anthony Everitt (born 31 January 1940) is a British author. He publishes regularly in The Guardian and The Financial Times. He worked in literature and visual arts. He was Secretary-General of the Arts Council of Great Britain. He is a visiting professor in the performing and visual arts at Nottingham Trent University. Everitt is a companion of the Liverpool Institute of Performing Arts and an Honorary Fellow of the Dartington College of Arts.

Everitt has written books about Roman history, amongst which biographies of Augustus, Hadrian and Cicero and a book on The Rise of Rome. He lives in Wivenhoe near Colchester.

Everitt read English literature at the University of Cambridge.

Books
 Everitt, Anthony. Cicero: The Life and Times of Rome's Greatest Politician. Random House, 2001.
 Everitt, Anthony. Augustus: The Life of Rome's First Emperor. Random House, 2006.
 Everitt, Anthony. Hadrian and the Triumph of Rome. Random House, 2009.
 Everitt, Anthony. The Rise of Rome: The Making of the World's Greatest Empire. Random House, 2012.
 Everitt, Anthony and Roddy Ashworth. SPQR: A Roman Miscellany. Head of Zeus, 2015.
 Everitt, Anthony. The Rise of Athens: The Story of the World's Greatest Civilization. Random House, 2016.
 Everitt, Anthony. Alexander the Great: His Life and His Mysterious Death. Random House, 2019.

References

British biographers
British writers
Financial Times people
The Guardian journalists
People from Wivenhoe
People educated at Cheltenham College
Alumni of Corpus Christi College, Cambridge
Living people
1940 births
British historians